The Fairs and Markets Act 1850 is an Act that was passed by the Parliament of the United Kingdom. Among other things, it tightened restrictions on the Sunday operation of fairs and markets.

As late as 1899, it was noticed in Model byelaws, rules and regulations under the public health and other acts : with alternative and additional clauses.

See also
 Sunday Observance Act 1780

References

United Kingdom Acts of Parliament 1850
History of Christianity in the United Kingdom
Law about religion in the United Kingdom
Cultural history of the United Kingdom
Sunday
Public health